The Vander Elst visa is a type of visa or work permit available to non-EEA/EFTA citizens employed by and working for a company in an EU/EEA/EFTA country, that allows them to work for that company in another EEA/EFTA member state, subject to meeting certain eligibility conditions.

The name comes from a legal case where Raymond Vander Elst appealed his case to the European Court of Justice and won in 1994.

However, it seems to vary how this is implemented, and often non-EEA-citizens need a normal work visa or work permit when working in another member country regardless of employer

See also
Visa policy of the Schengen Area (but Vander Elst visas apply also to non-Schengen countries in the EU/EEA)

References

European Economic Area
Visa policies in Europe